Cecil Altman Boone (June 1, 1935 – January 20, 2023), known as Nick Todd, was an American pop singer. He was the younger brother of pop singer Pat Boone. He had two hit records called "Plaything" and "At The Hop", which reached No. 41 and No. 21, respectively, on the Billboard Hot 100 chart. "Plaything" debuted in October 1957 and "At The Hop" debuted in December 1957, the same month Danny & the Juniors' version reached No. 1 on the chart.

The president of Dot Records, Randy Wood, did not want him using the same last name as his brother, so he made up "Todd", which is basically "Dot" (Records) spelled backwards. Both recordings were backed by Billy Vaughn and his Orchestra.

Nick Todd earned a master's degree in social work from the University of Tennessee and during the 1970s was executive director of West Tennessee AGAPE, a family service organization. He later moved to Nashville, Tennessee, where he continued work as a social worker, song leader among the churches of Christ, and instructor in Social Work at David Lipscomb University.

Todd died on January 20, 2023, at 87 years old, confirmed in a written statement by his brother Pat Boone.

References

1935 births
American male singers
Living people
Musicians from Jacksonville, Florida
Boone family (show business)